Khaigala (also spelled Khai Gala) is a town in Rawalakot tehsil Poonch district of Azad Kashmir. It is located in Rawalakot tehsil of the Poonch district.

Notable people
The Sudhan (Sadozai) is main ethnic group of Khaigala. Other smaller groups are also found in Khaigala which includes Gakhars, Pathans, Gujjars, Rajput Chowdhary (Kaswi), Awan, Gujjar, Mahajir, Abbasi and Khawaja, Some ethnic groups like Kalals are using Kiyani with their names that is majorly used by Gakhars only.
Sardar Muhammad Yaqoob Khan former President of Azad Kashmir was also from Khaigala

References

Populated places in Poonch District, Pakistan